In civil engineering, a reverse curve (or "S" curve) is a section of the horizontal alignment of a highway or railroad route in which a curve to the left or right is followed immediately by a curve in the opposite direction.

On highways in the United States reverse curves are often announced by the posting of a W1-4L sign (left-right reverse curve) or a W1-4R sign (right-left reverse curve), as called for in the Manual on Uniform Traffic Control Devices.

Reverse curves cause buffer-locking.

See also
S bridge
Road curve
Track geometry

References 

Railway track layouts